Baghdeo Singh was founder of Ramgarh Raj in North Chotanagpur. He was king of Khayaragarh. He was made Fauzdar of Karra under
the Nagvanshi. He suppressed rebellion in Tamar for Nagvanshi ruler. Nagvanshi send him to extract taxes from Karpurdeo the king of Karnpura. Baghdeo killed Karpurdeo and he declared himself as the King of that region.
 
According to Nag vanshavali written by Beniram Mahata,
, ghatwar kings rebelled. The king of Tamar indulged in plunder and loot. He seized fort of Nagvanshi king in Khukhragarh. Nagvanshi sought help of king of khayaragarh Baghdeo. Khayaragarh was capital of Khayaravala dynasty. Baghdeo was made Fauzdar of Karra Pargana and he suppressed rebellion Tamar. The son of king of Tamar made king of Karnpura but he did not paid tax for tree years. Baghdeo was sent to Karnpura to extract tax. Baghdeo defeated king of Kapardeo and killed him. He also destroyed their fort Mahudigarh. Baghdeo Singh, who was anyway in control of the area after quelling rebellion, simply stayed on and declared himself Raja of that area, which is said to have been 22 parganas (districts) in extent.

References

History of Jharkhand
14th-century Indian monarchs